Trevor Wayne Manning (born 19 December 1945 in Wellington) is a former field hockey goalkeeper from New Zealand, who was a member of the national team that won the golden medal at the 1976 Summer Olympics in Montreal, Quebec.

References

External links
 

New Zealand male field hockey players
Olympic field hockey players of New Zealand
Field hockey players at the 1968 Summer Olympics
Field hockey players at the 1972 Summer Olympics
Field hockey players at the 1976 Summer Olympics
Field hockey players from Wellington City
1945 births
Living people
Olympic medalists in field hockey
Medalists at the 1976 Summer Olympics
Olympic gold medalists for New Zealand